James McColl (13 November 1924 – 8 August 2013) was a Scottish footballer who represented Great Britain at the 1948 Summer Olympics, making two appearances.

A full back, McColl had been with amateur club Queen's Park until the Summer of the Olympics in which he played. After the Olympics he was one of two players in the GB Olympic squad to move that summer from Queens Park to Dumfries club, Queen of the South. The other was Dougie McBain.

McColl spent two seasons at Palmerston Park before he moved on to spend a season at each of Falkirk and Cowdenbeath.

References

1924 births
2013 deaths
Scottish footballers
Queen's Park F.C. players
Queen of the South F.C. players
Falkirk F.C. players
Cowdenbeath F.C. players
Scottish Football League players
Footballers at the 1948 Summer Olympics
Olympic footballers of Great Britain
Association football fullbacks